Saint Andrew's School may refer to:

Australia
St Andrew's School (Adelaide), South Australia
St Andrew's Cathedral School, Sydney, New South Wales, Australia

Singapore
Saint Andrew's School, Singapore, a family of schools in Singapore
Saint Andrew's Junior School (SAJS)
Saint Andrew's Secondary School (SASS)
Saint Andrew's Junior College (SAJC)

South Africa
St. Andrew's School, Bloemfontein
St. Andrew's Preparatory School, Grahamstown
St. Andrew's School for Girls, Johannesburg

United Kingdom

England
St Andrew's School, Pangbourne, Berkshire
St Andrew's School, an independent school in Medway, Kent
St Andrew's Church of England High School, Croydon, London
St Andrew's Catholic School, Surrey
St Andrew's High School, Worthing, West Sussex

Scotland
St Andrews Grammar School, St Andrews, Fife; now Madras College
St Andrew's High School, Clydebank, West Dunbartonshire
St Andrew's High School, Coatbridge, Coatbridge, North Lanarkshire
 St Andrew's High School, East Kilbride, South Lanarkshire; now St Andrew's and St Bride's High School
St Andrew's Secondary School, Glasgow

United States

Saint Andrew's School (Saratoga, California)
St. Andrew's School (Delaware)
Saint Andrew's School (Boca Raton, Florida)
Saint Andrew's School (Savannah, Georgia)
St. Andrew's Schools, Hawaii
St. Andrew the Apostle School, St. Andrew's Parish, Forest Hills, Boston, Massachusetts
St. Andrew's Catholic School (Newtown, Pennsylvania)
St. Andrew's School (Rhode Island)
St. Andrew's-Sewanee School, Sewanee, Tennessee
St. Andrews School (Virginia)

Elsewhere

St. Andrew's Scots School, Buenos Aires, Argentina
St Andrew's School (Bahamas)
St. Andrew's School, Brunei
St. Andrew's College, Aurora, Ontario, Canada
St. Andrew's School (Manitoba), St. Andrews, Canada
St. Andrews School (India)
St Andrew's College, Dublin
St. Andrews School, Turi, Kenya
St Andrew's Service Children's Primary School (Malta), Pembroke, Malta
St. Andrew's School (Mauritius)
St. Andrew's School (Parañaque), Philippines

See also
St Andrew's Academy (disambiguation)
St. Andrew's College (disambiguation)
St. Andrew's Episcopal School (disambiguation)
St. Andrews International School (disambiguation)
St Andrew's Primary School (disambiguation)